Chifamba may refer to:

Maud Chifamba (born 1997), Zimbabwean university student
Chisamba, a town in Zambia